This name may refer to one of two people:

Rafael Caro Quintero, Mexican drug lord
Miguel Caro Quintero, Mexican drug lord